Dioecious sedge is a common name for several plants and may refer to:
 Carex dioica, native to Europe and western Siberia
 Carex sterilis, native to North America